Banksia nutans var. cernuella is a variety of Banksia nutans. It is native to the Southwest Botanical Province of Western Australia. Seeds do not require any treatment, and take around 17 days to germinate.

References

 
 
 

nutans var. cernuella
Eudicots of Western Australia